Opening Night may refer to:

 Premiere, the debut (first public presentation) of a play, film, dance, or musical composition

Film
 The Opening Night, a 1927 American silent drama directed by Edward H. Griffith
 Opening Night (1977 film), an American drama by John Cassavetes
 Opening Night (2013 film), a film featuring Tuesday Knight
 Opening Night (2016 film), an American musical comedy directed by Isaac Rentz

Television
 Opening Night, a 1958 American television series consisting entirely of reruns of episodes of Ford Theatre
 Opening Night (TV series), a 1974–1975 Canadian television series

Episodes
 "Opening Night" (Curb Your Enthusiasm)
 "Opening Night" (Glee)
 "Opening Night" (Parenthood)
 "Opening Night" (Schitt's Creek)
 "Opening Night" (Smash)

Other uses
 Opening Night (album), a 2000 album by the Thad Jones/Mel Lewis Orchestra
 Opening Night (novel), a 1951 novel by Ngaio Marsh
 Opening Night (video game), a 1995 edutainment computer game